HD 71863 (HR 3346) is a solitary star in the southern circumpolar constellation Volans.

HD 71863 has a classification of G8/K0 III — intermediate between a G8 and K0 giant star. It has 2.65 times the mass of the Sun but has expanded to 11 times it's girth. HD 71863 metallicity – elements heavier than helium – is at solar level.

HD 71863 is located near a group of stars moving with a Carinae, but is just moving with them by coincidence, and has no relation to the group.

References

71863
3346
41321
Durchmusterung objects
G-type giants
K-type giants
Volans (constellation)
Volantis, 28